Waste sorting is the process by which waste is separated into different elements. Waste sorting can occur manually at the household and collected through curbside collection schemes, or automatically separated in materials recovery facilities or mechanical biological treatment systems. Hand sorting was the first method used in the history of waste sorting. Until now this method is still used.

Waste can also be sorted in a civic amenity site.

"Waste segregation" means dividing waste into dry and wet. Dry waste includes wood and related products, metals and glass. Wet waste typically refers to organic waste usually generated by eating establishments and are heavy in weight due to dampness. Waste segregation is different from waste sorting. Waste segregation is the grouping of waste into different categories. Each waste goes into its category at the point of dumping or collection, but sorting happens after dumping or collection. Segregation of waste ensures pure, quality material. Sorting on the other hand will end up producing impure materials with less quality.

Methods
Waste is collected at its source in each area and separated. The way that waste is sorted must reflect local disposal systems. The following categories are common:
 Paper
 Cardboard (including packaging for return to suppliers)
 Glass (clear, tinted–no light bulbs or window panes, which belong with residual waste)
 Plastics
 Textiles
 Wood, leather, rubber
 Scrap metal
 Compost
 Special/hazardous waste
 Residual waste

Organic waste can also be segregated for disposal:
 Leftover food which has had any contact with meat can be collected separately to prevent the spread of bacteria.
 Meat and bone can be retrieved by bodies responsible for animal waste.
 If other leftovers are sent, for example, to local farmers, they can be sterilised before being fed to the animals.
 Peels and scrapings from fruit and vegetables can be composted along with other degradable matter. Other waste can be included for composting, such as cut flowers, corks, coffee grounds, rotting fruit, tea bags, eggshells and nutshells, and paper towels.

Mechanisms for automated sorting

Automation of municipal solid waste sorting process is an active research area. Notable mechanisms for automated sorting include:

 Standardization of products, especially of packaging which are often composed of different materials, in particular materials hard or currently impossible to either separate or recycle together in an automated way.
Laws related to recyclability, waste management, domestic materials recovery facilities, product composition, biodegradability and prevention of import/export of specific wastes.
Since around 2017, China, Turkey, Malaysia, Cambodia, and Thailand have banned certain waste imports. It has been suggested that such bans may increase automation and recycling, decreasing negative impacts on the environment.
 Optical sorting
 Spectral imaging based sorting
 Systems that use hyperspectral imaging and algorithms developed via machine learning
 Near infrared spectroscopy
 X-ray based sorting
 Laser-induced breakdown spectroscopy
 Eddy current based sorting

By country

In Germany, regulations exist that provide mandatory quotas for the waste sorting of packaging waste and recyclable materials such as glass bottles.

In Denpasar, Bali, Indonesia, a pilot project using an automated collecting machine of plastic bottles or aluminium cans with voucher reward has been implemented in a market.

In India, the government inaugurated the Swachh Bharat Mission ("Clean India Mission") in 2014, a nationwide cleanup effort. Before this national consolidated effort for systematic and total waste management came into common consciousness, many cities and towns in India had already launched individual efforts directed at municipal waste collection of segregated waste, either based on citizen activism and/or municipal efforts to set up sustainable systems.

In Ukraine, people are learning to sort garbage. Garbage is sorted in schools and kindergartens in Khmelnytsky.

In the United States, the Environmental Protection Agency reports that the infrastructure for recycling waste has not kept pace with the rate of waste production.

Globally 

In terms of plastic waste sorting and recycling, an estimated 9% of the estimated 6.3 billion tonnes of plastic waste from the 1950s up to 2018 has been recycled and another 12% has been incinerated with the rest reportedly being "dumped in landfills or the natural environment".

See also

 Automated vacuum collection
 Curbside collection
 Materials recovery facility
 Mechanical biological treatment
 Mixed waste
 Recycling
 Reverse vending machine
 Waste collection

References

External links
 

Waste management
Recycling